The Caterpillar 777 is a 100-ton haul truck, typically used in open pit mining, manufactured by Caterpillar Inc.

The first model of Caterpillar 777 was introduced in 1974. Its diesel engine is capable of putting out .  The 777D, introduced in 1996, was powered by a  diesel.

References

Dump trucks
Off-road vehicles
Mining equipment
Caterpillar Inc. trucks
Articles containing video clips
Vehicles introduced in 1974